Harristown may refer to:

Australia 
 Harristown, Queensland, a suburb of Toowoomba

Ireland 
Harristown, Naas South, County Kildare
Harristown (Parliament of Ireland constituency), disestablished 1801
Harristown (civil parish), West Offaly, County Kildare (in King's County until 1840)

United States 
Harristown, Illinois, village in Macon County
 Harristown Township, Macon County, Illinois
Harristown, Indiana